The fourth season of the American science fiction television series Star Trek: The Next Generation commenced airing in broadcast syndication in the United States on September 24, 1990 and concluded on June 17, 1991 after airing 26 episodes. Set in the 24th century, the series follows the adventures of the crew of the Starfleet starship Enterprise-D.

This season saw the show embracing the notion of serialized storylines. A recurring theme throughout the season is the notion of a brewing Duras-Romulan plot against the Federation, coupled with Worf's effort to reclaim his family honor. Both storylines were introduced in Season 3's "Sins of the Father". Worf's discommendation is a major theme in "Family" and "The Drumhead", while his dishonor and the Duras-Romulan plot take center stage in the episodes "Reunion", "The Mind's Eye", and "Redemption".

A second recurring storyline in the season is the growth of Miles O'Brien as a character. His first and middle name are revealed in "Family", he marries in "Data's Day", his past is revealed in "The Wounded", and his marriage is explored in "In Theory".

Season 4 featured many family-themed episodes. The first episode following "The Best of Both Worlds" deals with Picard and Worf's family, and the second with Data's. Worf's son Alexander appears later in the season, as does Tasha Yar's sister, and the Enterprise encounters an infant alien space entity.

While a stand-alone syndicated series, the series was paired with other shows for the two night syndicated programming block Hollywood Premiere Network from Chris-Craft TV and MCA TV.

Cast

Recurring characters

Episodes

In the following table, episodes are listed by the order in which they aired.

Home media

Reception
In 2019, CBR rated Season 4 of Star Trek: The Next Generation as the 12th best season of all Star Trek seasons up to that time.

Footnotes

External links
 Episode guide  at Star Trek.com
 

Star Trek: The Next Generation seasons
1990 American television seasons
1991 American television seasons